La Pellerine is a commune in the Mayenne department in north-western France.

See also
Communes of Mayenne

References

Pellerine